Bryan C. Williams is the former acting chairman of the Ohio Republican Party.

Career 
He was a Republican member of the Ohio House of Representatives from 1997 to 2004.  He resigned on March 5, 2004 to become the Summit County, Ohio Chair of the Board of Elections.  He was succeeded by Marilyn Slaby, who went on to lose to another Brian Williams, who was a Democrat.

Williams currently serves on the Ohio State Board of Education, representing District 5.  He was elected in November, 2012 to a four-year term. Due to ethics violations, he resigned from the District 7 seat he represented in the prior term.

Following the resignation of chairwoman Jane Timken on February 5, 2021, William became the acting chairman of the Ohio Republican Party, due to previously holding the position of vice chairman.

Personal life 
He resides in Fairlawn, with his wife and 2 of 3 children.

References

https://www.dispatch.com/article/20131209/NEWS/312099774
https://www.wkyc.com/article/news/education/state-board-of-ed-member-resigns-amid-ethics-concerns/95-316838787

External links
Ohio House bio

1964 births
21st-century American politicians
Living people
Republican Party members of the Ohio House of Representatives
People from Fairlawn, Ohio